George Alfred Baitsell (1885 – September 24, 1971) was an American biologist. He was Professor of biology at Yale University.
He was an official of the American Association for the Advancement of Science, and published several science books.

Publications
 The evolution of man, New Haven, Yale University Press, 1922
 Manual of animal biology, New York, Macmillan, 1932
 Human biology, New York, McGraw-Hill, 1940
 Science in progress, New Haven, Yale University Press, 1949 (editor)
 The Centennial of the Sheffield Scientific School, Yale University Press, 1950 (editor)

Family
George Alfred Baitsell was the first son of John Albert Baitsell (1847-1929) and Amanda Clammer (1859-1936); he had a sister, Bessie (died in 1887 three weeks after her birth), and two brothers, John Merrill (1889-1905), and Carl Merrill (born 1891).
He and his wife Dorothy Morton Horning (1885-1967) had a son, John Morton Baitsell, and Dorothy (DeeDee) Baitsell. John Morton Baitsell married Carol Todd and is survived by his two children, John Baitsell Jr. and Sarah Baitsell Oliver. John Baitsell Jr. has two children, Adam Baitsell and Aidan Baitsell. Sarah Oliver is married to Mark Oliver, and has two children, Annie Oliver and Wilson Oliver.

References

External links
 Baitsell, George Alfred at WorldCat
 Baitsell, George Alfred at HathiTrust
 Baitsell, George Alfred at Smithsonian Institution
 Portraits at hpsrepository.asu.edu: 1925, undated

1885 births
1971 deaths
20th-century American biologists
American Association for the Advancement of Science
Central College (Iowa) alumni
Yale University faculty
Scientists from Iowa